Thomas Norris (died 1607), of Congham, Norfolk, was an English politician.

He was a Member (MP) of the Parliament of England for Castle Rising in 1586. He married Elizabeth Guybon and they had two sons and one daughter.

References

16th-century births
1607 deaths
English MPs 1586–1587
People from Congham